A contagious disease is an infectious disease that is readily spread (that is, communicated) by transmission of a pathogen through contact (direct or indirect) with an infected person.

A disease is often known to be contagious before medical science discovers its causative agent. Koch's postulates, which were published at the end of the 19th century, were the standard for the next 100 years or more, especially with diseases caused by bacteria. Microbial pathogenesis attempts to account for diseases caused by a virus.

The disease itself can also be called a contagion.

Historical meaning 
Originally, the term referred to a contagion (a derivative of 'contact') or disease transmissible only by direct physical contact. In the modern-day, the term has sometimes been broadened to encompass any communicable or infectious disease. Often the word can only be understood in context, where it is used to emphasize very infectious, easily transmitted, or especially severe communicable diseases.

In 1849, John Snow first proposed that cholera was a contagious disease.

Effect on public health response 

Most epidemics are caused by contagious diseases, with occasional exceptions, such as yellow fever. The spread of non-contagious communicable diseases is changed either very little or not at all by medical isolation of ill persons or medical quarantine for exposed persons. Thus, a "contagious disease" is sometimes defined in practical terms, as a disease for which isolation or quarantine are useful public health responses.

Some locations are better suited for the research into the contagious pathogens due to the reduced risk of transmission afforded by a remote or isolated location.

Negative room pressure is a technique in health care facilities based on aerobiological designs.

See also
 Germ theory of disease
 Herd immunity

References

Infectious diseases
Microbiology
Diseases and disorders
Epidemiology
Causality